Mahoma Hydroelectric Power Station is a  mini-hydroelectric power plant in Uganda.

Location
The power station is located across the Mahoma River (also Dura River), in Kabarole District,  Western Uganda.

Overview
This power station was developed by two Sri Lankan companies, the MG Group of Companies and Renewgen Limited. The Mahoma mini-hydro project is a run-of-the-river hydroelectricity project with planned annual output of 3,000kW of energy

The power generated is sold to the Uganda Electricity Transmission Company Limited (“UETCL”), and distributed into the national electricity grid, with priority being given to local residents, by design and by agreement with the Electricity Regulatory Authority, via a 20 year power purchase agreement.

Ownership and funding
The power station is owned and operated by the two Sri Lankan energy companies that developed the power station, over a twenty-months period, from January 2017 until October 2018. The cost of construction is reported at US$8 million (USh29.6 billion). The main contractor on this project was KSJ Construction of Sri Lanka.

The same investors also own the 7.6 megawatts Kyambura Hydroelectric Power Station, developed across the Kyambura River in Rubirizi District.

See also
 List of power stations in Uganda

References

External links
 Website of the Electricity Regulatory Authority

Kabarole District
Dams completed in 2018
2018 establishments in Uganda
Buildings and structures in Uganda
Hydroelectric power stations in Uganda